2011 National Football Challenge Cup was the 21st season of Pakistan National Football Challenge Cup, the main domestic cup in Pakistani football. The tournament was hosted by PMC Athletico, with the tournament commencing from 14 April 2011 and concluding on 27 April 2011.

Teams
The 16 teams participating in the tournament are as below:

Teams
(TH: Challenge Cup title holders; PPL: Pakistan Premier League winners)
<div style="width:800px;">

Group stages

Group A

Group B

Group C

Group D

Knockout round

Quarter finals

Semi-finals

Third place

Final

Bracket

Top scorers

Top scorer

References

Football competitions in Pakistan
Pakistan National Football Challenge Cup
Cup
Pakistan